The 2021 Patriot League baseball tournament took place in consecutive weeks, with the semifinals held May 15–16 and the finals May 26–28.  The higher seeded teams hosted each best of three series.  The winner will earn the conference's automatic bid to the 2021 NCAA Division I baseball tournament.

Seeding
The top four finishers from the regular season were seeded one through four, with the top seed hosting the fourth seed and second seed hosting the third.  The visiting team was designated as the home team in the second game of each series.

Results

References

Tournament
Patriot League Baseball Tournament